COMSA EMTE was a Spanish construction and infrastructure engineering company specialising in road and rail transport infrastructure construction, electrical grid infrastructure, and general building construction.

History
The company was formed in July 2009 by a merger of Spanish construction Grupo COMSA and electrical infrastructure construction company Emte SA.

It was renamed to COMSA Corporación in 2015.

See also
Termosolar Borges

References

External links
Official website

Construction and civil engineering companies of Spain
2009 establishments in Spain
Companies based in Barcelona
Construction and civil engineering companies established in 2009
Spanish companies established in 2009
COMSA